Čabraď is a nature reserve in the Slovak municipality of Čabradský Vrbovok in the Krupina District. It has a protection level of 5 under the Slovak nature protection system and an IUCN-category Ia. The area was declared as a nature reserve for the protection of the richest habitat of reptiles on the territory of the Slovak republic for scientific research and educational purposes.

References

Protected areas of Slovakia
Protected areas established in 1967
1967 establishments in Czechoslovakia